Schwand im Innkreis is a municipality in the district of Braunau am Inn in the Austrian state of Upper Austria.

Geography
Schwand lies in the Innviertel. About 6 percent of the municipality is forest and 88 percent farmland.

References

Cities and towns in Braunau am Inn District